ʼOle, also called ʼOlekha or Black Mountain Monpa, is possibly a Sino-Tibetan language spoken by about 1,000 people in the Black Mountains of Wangdue Phodrang and Trongsa Districts in western Bhutan. The term ʼOle refers to a clan of speakers.

Locations
According to the Ethnologue, ʼOlekha is spoken in the following locations of Bhutan.
Trongsa District: 3 enclaves west of Mangde river
Wangdue Phodrang District: Adha, Jangji, Rukha, Thrumzur, and Wangling villages

Dialects are separated by the Black Mountains.

Varieties
Black Mountain Monpa is spoken in at least 6 villages. The variety spoken in Rukha village, south-central Wangdi is known as ʼOlekha. Out of a population of 100-150 people (about 15 households) in Rukha village, there is only one elderly female fluent speaker and two semi-fluent speakers of ʼOlekha.

George van Driem (1992) reports a Western dialect (spoken in Rukha and Reti villages) and Eastern dialect (spoken in Cungseng village).

History
ʼOle was unknown beyond its immediate area until 1990, and is now highly endangered, and was originally assumed to be East Bodish. George van Driem described ʼOle as a remnant of the primordial population of the Black Mountains before the southward expansion of the ancient East Bodish tribes.

More recently, Gwendolyn Hyslop (2016), agreeing with van Driem, has suggested that ʼOle is an isolate branch of the Sino-Tibetan family that has been heavily influenced by East Bodish languages. Because of the small number of cognates with East Bodish languages once loans are identified, Blench and Post provisionally treat ʼOle as a language isolate, not just an isolate within Sino-Tibetan.

External relationships
ʼOle forms a distinct branch of Sino-Tibetan/Tibeto-Burman. it is not closely related to Tshangla language of eastern Bhutan, also called "Monpa" and predating Dzongkha in the region, which belongs to a different branch of the family.

Gerber (2018) notes that Black Mountain Mönpa has had extensive contact with Gongduk before the arrival of East Bodish languages in Bhutan. The following comparative vocabulary table from Gerber (2020) compares Gongduk, Black Mountain Mönpa, and Bjokapakha, which is a divergent Tshangla variety.

Comparison of numerals:

Comparison of pronouns:

Vocabulary
Hyslop (2016) notes that ʼOlekha has borrowed heavily from East Bodish and Tibetic languages, but also has a layer of native vocabulary items. Numerals are mostly borrowed from East Bodish languages, while body parts and nature words are borrowed from both Tibetic and East Bodish languages. Hyslop (2016) lists the following ʼOlekha words of clearly indigenous (non-borrowed) origin.

six: 
head: 
face: 
rain: 
earth: 
ash: 
stone: 
fire: 
grandfather: 
grandmother: 
chicken: 
mustard: 
cotton: 
eggplant: 
foxtail millet: 

The pronouns and lexical items for all foraged plants are also of indigenous origin. Additionally, the central vowel /ɤ/ and voiced uvular fricative /ʁ/ are only found in non-borrowed words.

Words whose origin is not certain (i.e., may or may not be borrowed) are:

nose:  (perhaps borrowed from East Bodish?)
arm:  (perhaps borrowed from Tibetic?)
wind: 
water: 
mother: 
father: 
dog: 
sheep: 
barley: 
bitter buckwheat: 

The cardinal numerals are:
1. tɛk
2. nhü
3. sam
4. blö
5. lɔŋ
6. o̤ːk
7. nyí
8. jit [ʤit]
9. doːga
10. chö

References

Further reading

External links 
Himalayan Languages Project: Black Mountain Mönpa

Languages of Bhutan
Olekha